Charly Runciman (born 22 July 1993) is an Australian professional rugby league footballer who plays as a  and er for the St. George Illawarra Dragons in the Canterbury Cup NSW. 

He previously played for the St. George Illawarra Dragons in the NRL and the Widnes Vikings in the Super League.

Background
Born in Dubbo, New South Wales, Runciman played his junior football for the St Johns and Dubbo CYMS, before being signed by the St. George Illawarra Dragons.

Playing career

Early career
In 2012 and 2013, Runciman played for the St. George Illawarra Dragons' NYC team. At the end of 2012, he was named the Dragons' NYC Player of the Year. On 20 April 2013, he played for the New South Wales under-20s team against the Queensland under-20s team.

2013
In Round 16 of the 2013 NRL season, Runciman made his NRL debut for the Dragons against the Penrith Panthers. On 27 August 2013, he was named at centre in the 2013 NYC Team of the Year. On 13 October 2013, he played for the Junior Kangaroos against the Junior Kiwis.

2014
On 23 May 2014, Runciman re-signed with the Dragons on a 2-year contract.

2015
On 21 July 2015, Runciman signed a -year contract with Super League team Widnes effective immediately, after being granted a release from the final  years of his Dragons contract.

References

External links

Widnes Vikings profile
St. George Illawarra Dragons profile
SL profile

1993 births
Living people
Australian rugby league players
Australian expatriate sportspeople in England
Illawarra Cutters players
Junior Kangaroos players
Rugby league centres
Rugby league players from Dubbo
Rugby league wingers
St. George Illawarra Dragons players